Banning Corner is an extinct town that was located in Warren Township in Warren County, Indiana, north of the town of Independence.

A few buildings in the community exist, and it is still cited by the USGS.

Geography
The site is situated in open farm land at the intersection of County Roads 350 North and 825 East, approximately two miles north of Independence.

References

Former populated places in Warren County, Indiana
Ghost towns in Indiana